Mary Louise Smith may refer to:

Mary Louise Smith (activist) (born 1937), American civil rights protester
Mary Louise Smith (politician) (1914–1997), U.S. political organizer and women's rights activist

See also

Mary "America's Sweetheart" Gladys Louise Smith Pickford (1892–1979) silent film era actress
Louise Noun-Mary Louise Smith Iowa Women's Archives, University of Iowa Libraries 
Mary Louise (name)
Mary (given name)
Louise (given name)
Smith (surname)
 
Mary Louise (disambiguation)
Mary Smith (disambiguation)
Louise Smith (disambiguation)
Mary (disambiguation)
Louise (disambiguation)
Smith (disambiguation)